John Joseph Fegan (19 July 1908 – 9 April 1981) was an Irish Australian film and television actor. He appeared in many Australian films and television shows in the 1950s, 1960s and 1970s, including the long-running series Homicide as Inspector Jack Connolly. He was born in Belfast, in what is now Northern Ireland.

Early life 
Fegan grew up in the Falls Road area of Belfast and moved to Australia in 1929. He made his way to Sydney where he worked as a labourer, including as a harbourside worker on The Hungry Mile during the Great Depression. 
He became involved in the worker's theatre movement, in particular with the New Theatre League from the 1930s onwards, receiving generally positive reviews for his performances. 

Fegan continued working on the docks throughout his working life, never committing fully to his acting career.

National Service 
He joined the Australian army during World War II and served in New Guinea.

Homicide
Homicide was the first major television series to be produced in Australia, the domestic television market having been previously dominated by American and British imports. Homicide proved that there was a market for home-grown programming and was highly successful. For this reason, as well as for inspiring a series of popular police dramas that followed, it remains one of the most important programmes in the history of Australian television.

Fegan starred as Inspector Jack Connolly, head of the squad – a seasoned policeman in the classic dry, gruff mould that remains popular in similar shows today. The name Connolly was selected to reflect the Irish influence in Australian police forces and no doubt it helped to account for Fegan's still strong Belfast accent. The show was so popular and considered so accurate (police procedure was followed faithfully and police advisors ensured that things were done correctly) that the actors were often confused for real police officers and, at one point, Fegan was invited to a policeman's ball.

Fegan retired from Homicide in 1969.

In 2007, Homicide was chosen for a 50-cent stamp to celebrate 50 years of television in Australia.  Fegan, as Inspector Connolly, is standing in the centre of the stamp, flanked by fellow original cast members Lex Mitchell and Terry McDermott.

Division 4
After leaving Homicide, John Fegan guest starred in a number of other television series. In particular, he appeared as the recently released from prison John Kelso in episode 100 of Division 4, another Australian police drama. The episode was critically lauded and Fegan received a Logie Award for 'Best Individual Acting Performance' for his efforts.

Filmography

Incidents of note

Fegan appeared uncredited as a drover in the 1960 film the Sundowners.  Robert Mitchum, who starred in the film, is quoted as having said of that production "We didn't have stuntmen, so they got an Irish expatriate off the docks, and he beat the tar out of me" (referring to filming brawl scene).  Fegan was the Irish expatriate in question.

In 1970 John Fegan guest starred in an episode of The Link Men, yet another Australian police drama.  It would have been a footnote in a short-lived series, but for an incident on set.  Two young actors were performing or rehearsing a fight scene when Frank Packer, the owner of the Network, came in. Packer, who had been a boxer in his younger days but who at the time was in his mid-sixties, declared that they were doing it wrong and demonstrated the correct technique by putting the actor playing the police officer in a headlock.  Fegan, also in his sixties, had been watching from behind the camera and suggested that, since the young actor was the one who was supposed to be performing the headlock then perhaps Packer should demonstrate on him (Fegan) so the young actor could watch. Packer got Fegan in the same headlock but Fegan, who had also been a boxer in his younger days, got the better of him and Packer ended up on the ground. According to an article about the event in the Sydney Morning Herald, Packer's hearing aid came flying out and Fegan lashed out and crushed it with his foot.  Packer insisted that Fegan be fired on the spot. Upon being advised that Fegan was performing a single-episode guest role only, Packer's response was reportedly "Well, sack him when he's finished".

Political activism
Radicalised both by his formative years as a Belfast Catholic (having been involved with the Fianna before leaving Northern Ireland) and the Great Depression, Fegan was active in a variety of left wing movements associated with the Australian labour movement in Sydney throughout in particular his early life, including the  Communist Party of Australia (CPA), the Sydney variants of the Unemployed Workers Movement/Workers Defence Committee (UWM/WDC) and a small group called the "Irish Terrorists Association" (one of the ten members of which it later turned out was an undercover policeman).

References

External links

1908 births
1981 deaths
20th-century American male actors
Australian male television actors
Northern Ireland emigrants to Australia
Logie Award winners